Constantin Teașcă also known as Titi Teașcă (25 September 1922 – 30 July 1996) was a Romanian football play and manager.

Teașcă was the manager of Romania in 1962 and 1967. He managed Turkish side Fenerbahçe from 1970 to 1971. He was also the manager of Steaua Bucharest from 1974 to 1975. Teașcă has a total of 323 matches as a manager in the Romanian top-division, Divizia A consisting of 120 victories, 64 draws and 139 losses.

He was also an avid reader and a writer, with witty remarks that made him a celebrity, having written a total of five volumes: Fotbal și fotbaliști la diferite meridiane (Football and footballers at different meridians) (1962), Fotbal la poalele Cordilierilor (Football at the foot of the Cordilleras) (1966), Din nou pe meridianele fotbalului (Again on the meridians of football) (1967), Ce rău v-am făcut? (What harm have I done to you?) (1976), Păpușarii (The puppeteers) (1984), Competiţii de neuitat (Unforgettable competitions) (1989).

Honours

Manager
Dinamo București
Divizia A: 1961–62

Fenerbahçe
Süper Lig runner-up: 1970–71 

Universitatea Craiova
Cupa României: 1976–77

References

1922 births
1996 deaths
People from Giurgiu
Romanian footballers
Association football midfielders
Romanian football managers
FC Dinamo București managers
FC Steaua București managers
Süper Lig managers
Fenerbahçe football managers
FC Universitatea Cluj managers
CS Universitatea Craiova managers
FC Brașov (1936) managers
Romania national football team managers
Romanian expatriate football managers
Expatriate football managers in Turkey
FCM Bacău managers
FC Argeș Pitești managers
FC Bihor Oradea managers
Victoria București managers
Romanian writers
20th-century Romanian writers
Romanian male writers
20th-century Romanian male writers